Mountaintown Creek is a stream in Gilmer County, Georgia, United States, that is a tributary of the Coosawattee River.

The creek was named after "Mountain Town", a local Native American settlement.

See also

 List of rivers in Georgia (U.S. state)

References

	

Rivers of Georgia (U.S. state)
Rivers of Gilmer County, Georgia